The Fatima Bint Mubarak Ladies Open is a golf tournament on the Ladies European Tour first played in 2016. It is played at the Saadiyat Beach Golf Club in Abu Dhabi, United Arab Emirates.

Winners

References

External links
Coverage on the Ladies European Tour's official site

Ladies European Tour events
Golf tournaments in the United Arab Emirates
Recurring sporting events established in 2016
Autumn events in the United Arab Emirates
2016 establishments in the United Arab Emirates